The Highland Mountains in Nevada connect with the Eldorado and Newberry mountains.

References 

Mountain ranges of Nevada
Mountain ranges of the Mojave Desert
Mountain ranges of Clark County, Nevada
Mountain ranges of the Lower Colorado River Valley